Cherry Tree, Indiana is a neighborhood of Carmel, Indiana. The area is centered on the intersection of Gray Road and Smokey Row Road in Hamilton County. Cherry Tree is known for large homes with some of be best, extensive walking and biking trails in Indianapolis Metropolitan Area.

References

Neighborhoods in Indiana
Populated places in Hamilton County, Indiana
Carmel, Indiana